The Love Race is a 1931 British comedy film directed by Lupino Lane and starring Stanley Lupino, Jack Hobbs and Dorothy Boyd. It was adapted from Stanley Lupino's own play of the same name and was produced by British International Pictures. It was shot at the company's Elstree Studios outside London. The film's sets were designed by the art director Duncan Sutherland.

Plot summary
A mix-up with suitcases lands a wealthy racing driver (Stanley Lupino) into an embarrassing situation with his fiancée at a party.

Cast
Stanley Lupino as Reggie Powley
Jack Hobbs as Bobbie Mostyn
Dorothy Boyd as Ida Mostyn
Dorothy Bartlam as Rita Payne
Frank Perfitt as Mr Powley
Wallace Lupino as Ferdinand Fish
Arty Ash as Eustace
Florence Vie as Mrs Mostyn
Doris Rogers as Nernice Dawn

References

Bibliography
 Low, Rachael. Filmmaking in 1930s Britain. George Allen & Unwin, 1985.
 Wood, Linda. British Films, 1927-1939. British Film Institute, 1986.

External links

1931 films
1931 comedy films
Films directed by Lupino Lane
British auto racing films
British comedy films
British black-and-white films
Films shot at British International Pictures Studios
1930s English-language films
1930s British films